The 2014–15 season was Paris Saint-Germain Football Club's 45th in existence and their 42nd in the top-flight of French football. The team competed in Ligue 1, the Coupe de France, the Coupe de la Ligue, the Trophée des Champions and the UEFA Champions League.

Summary
Just weeks after winning a first trophy of the season in Beijing, with the 2014 Trophée des Champions and the 2–0 win over Guingamp, PSG were struggling to impose themselves on Ligue 1. With three wins and five draws, the club was sitting five points adrift of Marseille after eight matches (19 points for Marseille and 14 for PSG).

After something of a World Cup hangover for the club's international stars, Les Rouge-et-Bleu really hit their stride in October, and especially November. Lens (1-3), Bordeaux (3–0), Lorient (1–2), Marseille (2–0), Metz (2–3) and Nice (1–0) were all defeated by Laurent Blanc's men. PSG moved second on the ladder, just one point behind Marseille and six ahead of Lyon. PSG were on their way, but December saw a first loss of the campaign to Guingamp (1–0) as the capital club finished the first half of the season in third place, three points adrift of Marseille.

The start of January saw PSG make a successful start to the Coupe de France, eliminating Montpellier 3–0. After a surprise 4–2 loss to Bastia in the league, PSG recorded a series of positive results which saw them fighting on all four fronts. In the UEFA Champions League, Thiago Silva and company wrote one of the most spectacular pages in the club's history: after a 1–1 home draw with Chelsea in the first leg of the round of 16, Les Parisiens produced an heroic qualification at Stamford Bridge, going through on the away goals rule. A prestigious victory over Marseille (3–2) and a win in the 2015 Coupe de la Ligue Final against Bastia (4–0) followed before PSG were eliminated from the Champions League by future finalists Barcelona. PSG bounced back by booking their place in the final of the Coupe de France with a resounding semi-final win against Saint-Étienne (4–0) and kept hopes alive of an unprecedented quadruple.

Fighting tooth and nail with Lyon in the championship, PSG set a cracking pace with a series of big wins (6–1 against Lille, 3–1 against Metz, 2–0 against Nantes and 6–0 against Guingamp). PSG were in unstoppable form and the pressure told as Lyon cracked against Caen, going down 3–0 in matchweek 36. In the end, it was at the Stade de la Mosson that PSG officially secured a fifth French championship in their history and the third in a row. The capital club then left their mark on French football by defeating Auxerre 1–0 with a goal from Edinson Cavani in the 2015 Coupe de France Final at the Stade de France to claim an unprecedented domestic quadruple.

Players

Players, transfers, appearances and goals - 2014/2015 season.

First-team squad

In on loan

Out on loan

Transfers in

Transfers out

Statistics

Appearances and goals

|-
! colspan="18" style="background:#dcdcdc; text-align:center"| Goalkeepers

|-
! colspan="18" style="background:#dcdcdc; text-align:center"| Defenders

|-
! colspan="18" style="background:#dcdcdc; text-align:center"| Midfielders

|-
! colspan="18" style="background:#dcdcdc; text-align:center"| Forwards

|-
! colspan="18" style="background:#dcdcdc; text-align:center"| Players transferred out during the season

|-

Competitions

Trophée des Champions

Ligue 1

League table

Results summary

Results by round

Matches

Coupe de France

Coupe de la Ligue

UEFA Champions League

Group stage

Knockout phase

Round of 16

Quarter-finals

References

External links

Official websites
PSG.fr – Site officiel
Paris Saint-Germain  at LFP
Paris Saint-Germain at UEFA
Paris Saint-Germain at FIFA

Paris Saint-Germain F.C. seasons
Paris Saint-Germain
Paris Saint-Germain
French football championship-winning seasons